Burgruine Gallenstein is a castle in Styria, Austria. The partially ruined Gallenstein Castle hosts many concerts and exhibitions as well as the annual Festival St. Gallen.

The noble family von Gallenstein resided at the castle at one point.

See also
List of castles in Austria

References

External links

Castles in Styria